The Italy A national rugby union team (Italian: Nazionale A di rugby a 15 dell'Italia, also known as Italia Emergenti which means Italy Emerging Players) are the second national rugby union team in Italy after the national side.

They competed in the Six Nations "A" from 2000 to 2003, in the IRB Nations Cup from 2006 until 2013, except in 2011 when they played the Churchill Cup. They have also participated in the IRB Tbilisi Cup in 2014.

From 2016 to 2018 it played in the World Rugby Nations Cup.

Tournament record

Current squad
On 10 January, the following players were called up for uncapped test against Romania A.On 17 January, D'Amico and Di Bartolomeo replace Hasa, Traorè, Manfredi and Krumov.

Head coach:  Alessandro Troncon

References

External links
 Official site F.I.R.

A
Second national rugby union teams